The Stern–Volmer relationship, named after Otto Stern and Max Volmer, allows the kinetics of a photophysical intermolecular deactivation process to be explored.

Processes such as fluorescence and phosphorescence are examples of intramolecular deactivation processes. An intermolecular deactivation is where the presence of another chemical species can accelerate the decay rate of a chemical in its excited state. In general, this process can be represented by a simple equation:

or

where A is one chemical species, Q is another (known as a quencher) and * designates an excited state.

The kinetics of this process follows the Stern–Volmer relationship:

This formula is derived from the Stokes–Einstein relation and is only useful in this form in the case of two spherical particles of identical radius that react every time they approach a distance R, which is equal to the sum of their two radii. The more general expression for the diffusion limited rate constant is

In reality, only a fraction of the collisions with the quencher are effective at quenching, so the true quenching rate coefficient must be determined experimentally.

See also 
Optode, a chemical sensor that makes use of this relationship

References 

Chemical kinetics